William Buller may refer to:
 William Buller (bishop)
 William Buller (racing driver)
 William Buller (cricketer)
 Bill Buller, Irish equestrian